An icicle is a spike of ice formed when water dripping or falling from an object freezes.

Icicle may also refer to:

Icicle (comics), a comic character
Icicle (yacht)
Icicle hitch, a knot
Icicle Creek, a stream in the U.S. state of Washington
"Icicle", a nickname of Icicle Reeder 
Icicle plant